An election commission is a body charged with overseeing the implementation of electioneering process of any country. The formal names of election commissions vary from jurisdiction to jurisdiction, and may be styled an electoral commission, a central or state election commission, an election board, an electoral council or an electoral court. Election commissions can be independent, mixed, judicial or executive. They may also be responsible for electoral boundary delimitation. In federations there may be a separate body for each subnational government. An election commission has a duty to ensure elections are conducted in an orderly manner.

Electoral models

Independent model 
In the independent model the election commission is independent of the executive and manages its own budget. Countries with an independent election commission include Australia, Bangladesh, Canada, India, Jordan, Nigeria, Pakistan, Poland, Romania, South Africa, South Korea, Sri Lanka, Thailand and the United Kingdom. In some of these countries the independence of the election commission is constitutionally guaranteed e.g. section 190 of the Constitution of South Africa.

Branch model
In the branch model the election commission is often called an electoral branch, and is usually a constitutionally-recognized separate branch of government, with its members appointed by either the executive or the legislative branch. Countries with an electoral branch include Bolivia, Costa Rica, Panama, Nicaragua and Venezuela.

Mixed model
In the mixed-model there is an independent board to determine policy, but implementation is usually a matter for an executive department with varying degrees of supervision by the independent board. Countries with such a model include Cameroon, France, Germany, Japan, Senegal and Spain.

Executive model
In the executive model the election commission is directed by a cabinet minister as part of the executive branch of government, and may include local government authorities acting as agents of the central body. Countries with this model include Denmark, Singapore, Sweden, Switzerland, Tunisia.

In the United States, elections for federal, state, and local offices are run by the executive branch of each state government.

Judicial model
In the judicial model the election commission is closely supervised by and ultimately responsible to a special "electoral court". Countries with such a model include Argentina, Brazil and Mexico.

List of election commissions

Afghanistan: 
Independent Election Commission (defunct since 2021)
Election Complaints Commission (defunct since 2021)
Albania: Central Election Commission
Argentina:
Dirección Nacional Electoral
Cámara Nacional Electoral
Australia: Australian Electoral Commission
Australian Capital Territory: Electoral Commission
New South Wales: Electoral Commission
Northern Territory: Electoral Commission
Queensland: Electoral Commission
South Australia: Electoral Commission
Tasmania: Electoral Commission
Victoria: Electoral Commission
Western Australia: Electoral Commission
Bangladesh: Election Commission
Belarus: Central Election Commission
Belize: Elections and Boundaries Commission
Bolivia:
Plurinational Electoral Organ (since 2010)
National Electoral Court (defunct since 2010)
Brazil: Superior Electoral Court
Regional Electoral Courts
Cambodia: National Election Committee
Canada: Elections Canada
Directeur général des élections du Québec
Elections Alberta
Elections BC
Elections Manitoba
Elections New Brunswick
Elections Newfoundland & Labrador
Elections Nova Scotia
Elections Nunavut
Elections NWT
Elections Ontario
Elections Prince Edward Island
Elections Saskatchewan
Elections Yukon
China (excl. Hong Kong and Macau): Election Committees for Local People's Congress elections only
Colombia: National Electoral Council
Costa Rica: Supreme Electoral Court
Cuba: Central State Administration and Local Government National Election Commission
Cyprus: Central Elections Office
Democratic Republic of the Congo: Independent National Electoral Commission
Egypt: High Elections Committee
Ethiopia: National Election Board
Fiji: Electoral Commission
France: Constitutional Council
Ghana: Electoral Commission
Guyana: Elections Commission
Haiti: Provisional Electoral Council
Hong Kong: Electoral Affairs Commission
Iceland: National Electoral Commission
India: Election Commission
Indonesia: General Elections Commission
Iran: Guardian Council
Iraq: Independent High Electoral Commission
Ireland: Electoral Commission (Ireland)
Israel: Central Elections Committee
Italy: Central Directorate for Electoral Services
Japan: Central Election Management Council
Jordan: Independent Election Commission
Kazakhstan: Central Election Commission
Kenya:
Interim Independent Electoral Commission (since 2008)
Electoral Commission (defunct since 2008)
Kosovo: 
Lao: National Election Committee (Lao)
Liberia: National Elections Commission
Libya: High National Election Commission
Macau: Electoral Affairs Commission (Macau)
Malaysia: Election Commission
Mexico:
National Electoral Institute
Federal Electoral Tribunal
Moldova: Central Election Commission
Myanmar (Burma): Union Electoral Commission
Nepal: Election Commission
New Zealand: Electoral Commission
Nicaragua: Supreme Electoral Council
Nigeria: Independent National Electoral Commission
North Korea: Central Election Committee (North Korea)
Northern Cyprus: High Electoral Board
Norway: Norwegian Directorate of Elections
Pakistan: Election Commission
Palestine: Central Elections Commission
Philippines: Commission on Elections
Once a winner is proclaimed, only these tribunals can rule on election matters:
Presidential Electoral Tribunal (entirely composed of the Supreme Court)
Senate Electoral Tribunal
House of Representatives Electoral Tribunal
Regional Trial Courts for local officials
Poland: National Electoral Commission
Portugal: National Elections Commission
Puerto Rico: State Elections Commission
Russia: Central Election Commission
Singapore: Elections Department
Somaliland: National Electoral Commission
South Africa: Independent Electoral Commission
South Korea: National Election Commission
Spain: Junta Electoral Central
Sri Lanka: Election Commission of Sri Lanka
Sweden: Election Authority
Taiwan (Republic of China): Central Election Commission
Tanzania : National Electoral Commission
Thailand: Election Commission
Tunisia: Independent High Authority for Elections
Turkey: Supreme Electoral Council of Turkey
Ukraine: Central Election Commission
United Kingdom: Electoral Commission
United States:
Election Assistance Commission, serves as a national clearinghouse and resource regarding election administration, establishes best practices, and provides financial aid to state electoral systems.
Federal Election Commission, regulates campaign finance legislation
Electoral Commission, a special commission for the 1876 presidential election
Florida: Florida Election Commission
Hawaii: Hawaii Elections Commission
Illinois: Illinois State Board of Elections
Maryland: Maryland State Board of Elections
New York: New York State Board of Elections
North Carolina: North Carolina State Board of Elections & Ethics Enforcement
Oklahoma: Oklahoma State Election Board
South Carolina: South Carolina State Election Commission
Virginia: Virginia State Board of Elections
Wisconsin: Wisconsin Elections Commission
Uruguay: Electoral Court
Venezuela: National Electoral Council
Vietnam: National Election Council (Vietnam)
Zimbabwe: Electoral Commission

Election commissions in Africa 

As of 2021, 53 out of 55 African nations (save for Eritrea and Somalia, which do not hold elections) use or have used election commissions to organize and supervise their elections. First introduced in the Sudan in 1957, election commissions were created across the continent especially after many African nations introduced a system of multi-party democracy in the early 1990s.

See also
Electoral college, a body which elects a candidate to a particular office.

Association of Central and Eastern European Election Officials
Association of African Election Authorities
Court of Disputed Returns

References

External links
Association of Asian Election Authorities
Association of European Election Officials

Elections